Mariangee Bogado (born July 4, 1984 in Mariara, Carabobo, Venezuela) is a Venezuelan softball player. She competed for Venezuela at the 2008 Summer Olympics.

Bogado played NCAA softball at Indiana University.

References

Living people
1984 births
Indiana Hoosiers softball players
Olympic softball players of Venezuela
Softball players at the 2008 Summer Olympics
Venezuelan softball players